Mason Proper is an American rock band formed in Alpena, Michigan, in 2004. The band consists of Jonathan Visger (singer), Matt Thompson (keyboard player), Zac Fineberg (bass guitarist), Brian Konicek (guitarist) and Garrett Jones (drummer).

History 
The band was formed in Alpena in 2004 and recorded extensively throughout the year. On 17 January 2006, they released There Is A Moth In Your Chest on their own Mang Chung label. Cover art was provided by Aaron Burtch, the drummer of Grandaddy.

In 2006, the group focused on promoting their first album, touring across the country and recording sessions. In September, the band signed with the New York-based Dovecote Records, and the self-released version of their album immediately went out of print. The band released a re-mixed, re-mastered, and in parts re-recorded version of There Is A Moth In Your Chest in 2007 for Dovecote. The band toured through most of 2007 in support of Moth," afterwards releasing a four-song EP of new material entitled Shorthand'''

The band released their second album, Olly Oxen Free, on September 23, 2008, on Dovecote Records.

 Discography There Is a Moth in Your Chest (Mang Chung) – January 17, 2006There Is a Moth in Your Chest (Dovecote) – March 13, 2007Short Hand EP – March 25, 2008Olly Oxen Free'' – September 23, 2008

References

External links 
 Official Mason Proper website

2004 establishments in Michigan
Dovecote Records artists
Indie rock musical groups from Michigan
Musical groups established in 2004
People from Alpena, Michigan